Albert Morris was a botanist.

Albert Morris may also refer to:

Albert Morris (musician) on National Emblem
Albert Morris, candidate in Sheffield City Council election, 1973
Albert Morris, co-founder of Fletcher Construction

See also

Al Morris, baseball outfielder
Bert Morris (disambiguation)